The Face Removed (German: Das ausgeschnittene Gesicht) is a 1920 German silent crime film directed by Franz Seitz and starring Carla Ferra and Ernst Rückert.

The film's sets were designed by the art director August Rinaldi.

Cast
 Carla Ferra as Estella 
 Heinrich Peer as Detective Fogg 
 Ernst Rückert
 Max Weydner as Harry Davis

References

Bibliography
 Grange, William. Cultural Chronicle of the Weimar Republic. Scarecrow Press, 2008.

External links

1920 films
Films of the Weimar Republic
Films directed by Franz Seitz
German silent feature films
1920 crime films
German crime films
German black-and-white films
1920s German films
1920s German-language films